Jadabpur Union is a union of Sakhipur Upazila, Tangail District, Bangladesh.

Demographics
According to the 2011 Bangladesh census, Jadabpur Union had 15,002 households and a population of 59,092. The literacy rate (age 7 and over) was 40.4% (male: 44.1%, female: 37%).

See also
 Union Councils of Tangail District

References

Populated places in Tangail District
Unions of Sakhipur Upazila